The 2022–23 Arizona State Sun Devils men's basketball team represent Arizona State University during the 2022–23 NCAA Division I men's basketball season. The Sun Devils are led by eighth-year head coach Bobby Hurley, and play their home games at Desert Financial Arena in Tempe, Arizona as members of the Pac–12 Conference. In the 2022-2023 season, the Sun Devils went 23-12 overall and 11-9 in Pac-12 play to qualify for the NCAA Tournament where they were an 11 seed. They defeated the University of Nevada to get to the Round of 64 versus TCU. During the regular season, ASU had big wins over #20 Michigan and #7 Arizona, the latter being beaten on a 60 foot buzzer beater by Desmond Cambridge Jr. They finished tied for 5th place in the Pac-12.

Previous season
The 2021–22 Sun Devils finished the season 14–17 overall, and 10–10 in conference play for eighth place. They lost to 9-seed Stanford in the first round of the Pac-12 tournament.

Off-season

Departures

Incoming transfers

2022 recruiting class

Roster

Schedule and results

|-
!colspan=12 style=| Regular season

|-
!colspan=12 style=| Pac-12 Tournament

|-
!colspan=12 style=| NCAA Tournament

|-

Source:

Notes

References

Arizona State Sun Devils men's basketball seasons
Arizona State
Arizona State Sun Devils men's basketball
Arizona State Sun Devils men's basketball
Arizona State